Mila is a fictional character based on the long-running British science fiction television series Doctor Who. A human prisoner of the Daleks, she becomes a companion of the Sixth Doctor while impersonating Charley Pollard. Actors Jess Robinson and India Fisher plays the character in a series of audio plays produced by Big Finish Productions.

Character history
Mila first appeared in the play Patient Zero. She was a human prisoner of the Daleks, captured during one of their wars. The Daleks experimented on her with bioengineered viruses to create a virus that turned the beings it infected into Daleks. Due to these experiments, Mila lost most of her memories and became invisible and non-corporeal, but also gained other unique abilities.

Mila later escaped from the Daleks and sneaked aboard the Doctor's TARDIS when he was being chased through time by the Daleks, implied to be during the events of the First Doctor serial The Chase. She remained in the TARDIS, unseen by anyone for centuries.

During the Sixth Doctor's life, she met Charley Pollard, the only companion unprotected by the TARDIS' biological defenses. With the TARDIS failing to protect Charley, Mila infected her, making Charley invisible and non-corporeal, while Mila took on Charley's physical form. Mila travelled with the Sixth Doctor for some time, pretending to be Charley (like in the audio drama Paper Cuts), while the real Charley was left invisible. In Blue Forgotten Planet, Charley is eventually cured by the Viyrans, while Mila chooses to sacrifice herself to save the Doctor and the Earth. Following Mila's death, the Viyrans and Charley altered the Doctor's memories, so that he remembered his adventures with Charley as being with Mila's name and face.

List of appearances

Audio dramas
Patient Zero
Paper Cuts
Blue Forgotten Planet

References

External links

Literary characters introduced in 2009
Doctor Who audio characters
Doctor Who spin-off companions